Mamak stalls are indoor and open-air food establishments particularly found in Southeast Asia, especially in the countries of Malaysia and Singapore, which serve a type of Indian Muslim cuisine unique to the region by its Indian community.

History 

Mamak stalls originate from Tamil Muslim origins of, whose forefathers mostly migrated from South India to the Malay Peninsula and various locations in Southeast Asia centuries ago. They are regarded as part of the Malaysian Indian/Singaporean Indian community, or "Straits Indian". Archaeological findings in the Bujang Valley of Kedah suggest a trade relationship with India as early as the 1st to 5th century C.E. An inscription dated 779 AD that refers to the trade relationship between the Tamilakam and the region was found in Nakhon Si Thammarat, Southern Thailand, dating back to the Nakhon Si Thammarat Kingdom.

The word 'Mamak' is from the Tamil term for maternal uncle, or 'maa-ma'. In Singapore and Malaysia, it is used by children as an honorific to respectfully address adults such as shopkeepers. Although the origins of the word are benign and neutral, it can sometimes be used as a derogatory term and insult against the Indian Muslim community in Malaysia and Singapore, and therefore its usage is generally avoided outside of specifically referring to Mamak stalls.

Mamak stalls and Hindu stalls are alike except the Mamaks, who are Muslims, do not serve pork but serve beef, whereas Hindus serve neither beef nor pork. There are also similar stalls run by local Malays.

Design 

Mamak stalls' affordable food and unpretentious atmosphere tend to create a casual dining atmosphere. Newer mamak stalls have more of a café aspect, usually being well lit and furnished with stainless steel tables. Some are outfitted with large flat screen televisions, or even projectors, so that patrons can catch the latest programs or live matches as they dine. Some mamak stalls also provide free Wi-Fi service. Despite these innovations, many modern mamak stalls attempt to retain their predecessors' open air dining atmosphere by setting up tables on a patio, the shoplot's walkway, or even on the street.

Mamak Fare 

A mamak stall usually offers different varieties of roti canai to eat and teh tarik, coffee, Milo, Horlicks and soft drinks to drink. Most mamak stalls also serve several varieties of rice, such as nasi lemak and nasi goreng, as well as noodle dishes such as mee goreng (fried noodles). Some stalls also offer satay and Western dishes.

A typical Mamak stall will offer the following dishes and beverages, though this differs from stall to stall:

 Roti canai (Malaysia and Brunei)
 Roti prata (Singapore)
 Teh tarik  
 Half-boiled eggs  
 Goat's milk
 Murtabak
 Thosai  
 Chapati  
 Nasi kandar  
 Biryani  
 Nasi lemak 
 Nasi goreng
 Maggi goreng  
 Mee goreng  
 Mie goreng  
 Mee rebus  
 Bihun goreng
 Kwetiau goreng  
 Char kway teow  
 Indomie  
 Pasembur  
 Mamak Rojak 
 Indian Rojak  
 Ayam Goreng (fried chicken)
 Maggi sup
 Bihun sup
 Sup Kambing (goat soup)
 Sup Ayam (chicken soup)
 Sup Tulang
 Roti Tissue  
 Roti Bakar  
 Kaya toast  
 Roti Bawang
 Roti Bom
 Roti Cheese
 Roti Planta
 Roti Pisang
 Roti Telur
 Roti Sardin
 Roti Jantan
 Roti Milo
 Naan with tandoori chicken  
 Puri or Poori  
 Papadum  
 Ais Kosong
 Limau Ais Kosong
 Nescafe
 Neslo (Nescafe with milo)
 Horlicks
 Barli
 Limau Ais
 Kopi 
 Milo Ais
 Milo Kosong
 Milo Panas
 Milo 'O'
 Sirap
 Sirap Limau
 Sirap Bandung
 Teh Ais (Iced tea)
 Teh Halia
 Teh 'O' Ais
 Teh 'O' Ais Limau
 Teh 'O' Panas
 Teh 'O' Kosong

Malay Tom Yam Stall
Recently, to attract more customers, some Mamak restaurants have added an extra stall in their restaurant. The stall, which is operated individually by either an ethnic Malay from the North East Peninsular Malaysia or an ethnic Malay from Southern Thailand, is known as Malay tom yam stall. This provides customers with more food options, such as:
 Tom yam
 Nasi paprik
 Nasi goreng Kampung (village-style fried rice)
 Nasi goreng Cina (Chinese fried rice)
 Nasi goreng USA ["Westernised" fried rice, hence "USA", served with prawn (U-dang), squid (S-otong) and chicken (A-yam)
 Nasi masak merah (red-cooked rice)
 Nasi pattaya (despite the name, the dish originated in Malaysia)
 Telur bistik (stuffed omelette)
 Sayur campur (mixed vegetables)
 Ikan pedas (spicy fish)
 Nasi lala (clam rice)

Tom yam stalls first appeared in Peninsular Malaysia circa late 1970s and early 1980s. Unlike local Malay food, the food is basically Thai based and somewhat similar to the cuisine in the state of Kelantan. The tom yam dishes have a mix of typically sweet, hot, and sour flavours. As the dishes are cooked immediately upon the customer's order, tom yam stalls are the Malay equivalent of fast food outlets albeit with Thai-based cuisine.

Tom yam stalls can also be found by the street or at designated areas such as car parks at night. These stalls tend to be popular. Many tom yam stalls are built illegally, usually on land reserved for public roads. Attempts to remove these illegal stalls have been fairly successful but such attempts can have a political price.

See also
 Kopi tiam – Similar to mamak stall, but with Chinese cuisine
 Punjabi dhaba – In India
 Warung – Street stalls in Indonesia

References

Malaysian cuisine
Singaporean cuisine
Restaurants in Malaysia
Restaurants in Singapore
Malaysian culture
Singaporean culture
Types of coffeehouses and cafés
Restaurants by type